Corban of Cluana is an Irish saint that died 732.

Corban was the founder of the church  of Kilcorban in the town land of Ballycorban, parish of Ballinakill, county Galway. His feast day was 19 July.

References

 Kilcorban Priory, Cathal Stanely, n.d.

People from County Galway
Year of birth unknown
732 deaths